The 2010–11 season was Sheffield Wednesday's first season in the third tier of English football since 2005 and their 109th season in the Football League.

Events
 7 August 2010 – Sheffield Wednesday start their season with a comfortable home win over Dagenham and Redbridge at Hillsborough.
 10 August 2010 – Sheffield Wednesday progress to the second round of the League Cup after beating Bury 1–0 at Hillsborough. The game was watched by 7,390 fans.
 11 August 2010 – Sheffield Wednesday are given 28 days to pay a £550,000 debt before potentially going into administration.
 24 August 2010 – Sheffield Wednesday are knocked out of the League Cup after a 4–2 loss at Scunthorpe United.
 9 November 2010 – Wednesday face a winding-up order over £600,000 of unpaid PAYE tax and also face a similar order over a £300,000 VAT bill.
 17 November 2010 – A High Court judge gives the club 28 days to find new owners and pay off their tax debt.
 29 November 2010 – Milan Mandaric's UK Football Investments buys the club for £7,000,001 pending shareholder approval. The deal would settle the club's £23 million debt with the Co-Operative Bank with a £7 million payment. An Extraordinary General Meeting of shareholders is called for 14 December.
 30 November 2010 – Wednesday are knocked out of the Football League Trophy after a 3–1 loss at Carlisle United.
 3 February 2011 – Alan Irvine is sacked as manager after 13 months in charge. The club were 12th in the table at the time.
4 February 2011 – Gary Megson is appointed as manager.
19 February 2011 – Wednesday reach the fifth round of the FA Cup for the first time in 11 years, but are knocked out by Birmingham City.
7 May 2011 – A loss to Exeter City in the final game of the season leaves Wednesday 15th in the final league table.

League table

Results

League One
Sheffield Wednesday's 2010/11 fixtures:

FA Cup

Sheffield Wednesday's 2010/11 FA Cup fixtures:

League Cup

Sheffield Wednesday's 2010–11 League Cup fixtures:

Football League Trophy

Sheffield Wednesday's 2010–11 Football League Trophy fixtures:

Players

First-team squad
Squad at end of season

Left club during season

Statistics

Appearances and goals

Scorers

All

League One

FA Cup

League Cup

Football League Trophy

As of games played 7 May 2011

Notes

References

External links
 Sheffield Wednesday F.C. official website

2010-11
2010–11 Football League One by team